Parton Halt railway station was opened by the LNWR and FR Joint Railway ("The Joint Line") in January 1915 and closed by the LMSR fourteen years later in 1929.

The halt was at the foot of steep tracks up to these workplaces.

Location
The line past the halt is clearly shown on standard railway maps, but the halt eludes them all; however, it is shown on contemporary OS maps.

Further research is needed to establish the physical nature of the halt, such structures in many parts of the country were very rudimentary.

History
The halt was on the WCER's Gilgarran Branch, occasionally referred to as the Gilgarron Branch. The company and the branch were fruits of the rapid industrialisation of West Cumberland in the second half of the nineteenth century.

All lines in the area were primarily aimed at mineral traffic, notably iron ore, coal and limestone, few more so than the Gilgarran Branch. Many iron mines, quarries, collieries and attendant works were situated in inaccessible areas with low populations, making workmen's trains a natural add-on service. Lowca had a workmen's service - and for a shorter period an advertised passenger service -  from the north along the clifftops provided by the Lowca Light Railway in conjunction with the Cleator and Workington Junction Railway (CWJR). The service to Parton Halt met the same need from the south.

Services

No Sunday passenger service was provided.

The initial service, which started on 11 January 1915, can be seen on the attached Working Time table (WTT) extract. Service times were set to match shift changes at the colliery and associated works. This was a common pattern with such halts across the country.

Goods traffic passed the halt, but did not call. The April 1917 Working Time Table shows three Up mineral trains travelling a mile beyond the halt to No 4 Pit and two travelling beyond to Distington Ironworks, with an extra on Saturdays, all matched by Down trains.

The line past the site of the halt went on to become a late survivor on the West Cumberland scene. The colliery at Lowca wound coal until 1968, feeding the associated works. After it closed coal continued to come from Solway Colliery, Workington until it closed in 1973, at which point the surviving business for the bi-product works and coal washery at Lowca was handled by road. The end products from Lowca were taken away northwards along the clifftops using the surviving parts of the Lowca Light Railway. Incoming coal from Solway Colliery was worked south along the coast line to Parton, where the train reversed  up the Gilgarron Branch, past the site of the halt to a junction known as "Bain's Siding" where it ran forward up the side of the valley to Lowca, effecting a zig-zag to gain the necessary height. Until 1968 at least, coal was also wound at No.4 Pit near Bain's Siding and taken down the branch past the site of the halt.

Rundown and closure
The halt closed in 1929, with buses able to provide a more attractive door-to-workplace gate service. The line past its site closed in May 1973. Nearby sidings were retained for many more years for civil engineers, but have since been lifted.

Afterlife
By 2013 most of the trackbed through the halt had been obliterated. Further towards Distington the Gilgarran Branch's route had been recycled as a public cycleway.

See also

 Furness Railway
 Whitehaven, Cleator and Egremont Railway
 Cleator and Workington Junction Railway

References

Sources

Further reading

External links
Map of the CWJR with photos RAILSCOT
Map of the WC&ER with photos RAILSCOT
The station Rail Map Online
The site of the halt on overlain OS maps surveyed from 1898 National Library of Scotland
The site of the halt on a 1948 OS Map npe maps
The line (halt as PARTON) railwaycodes
"The Joint Lines" including the halt cumberlandarchives.co.uk
The railways of Cumbria Cumbrian Railways Association
Photos of Cumbrian railways Cumbrian Railways Association
The railways of Cumbria Railways_of_Cumbria
Cumbrian Industrial History Cumbria Industrial History Society
Furness Railtour using many West Cumberland lines 5 September 1954 sixbellsjunction
A video tour-de-force of the region's closed lines cumbriafilmarchive
1882 RCH Diagram showing the line through the future halt, see page 173 of the pdf google
Haematite earthminerals
Coal and iron ore mining in Cleator Moor Haig Pit
The halt's site near bottom left corner of photo flickr

Disused railway stations in Cumbria
Railway stations in Great Britain opened in 1915
Railway stations in Great Britain closed in 1929